Mulinja  is a locality part of Uppala town, Kasaragod district, Kerala, India.

Demographics
As of 2011 India census, Mulinja village had total population of 3,841 which constitutes 1,803 males and 2,038 females. Mulinja village spreads over an area of 2.24 km2 with 751 families residing in it. Population in the age group 0-6 was 506 (13.2%) where 255 are males and 251 are females. 
Mulinja village had overall literacy of 91.2% where male literacy was 95.9% and female literacy of 87.1%.

Transportation
Local roads have access to National Highway No.66 which connects to Mangalore in the north and Calicut in the south.  The nearest railway station is Manjeshwar on Mangalore-Palakkad line. There is an airport at Mangalore.

Languages
This locality is an essentially multi-lingual region. The people speak Malayalam,  Tulu, Beary bashe and Konkani. Migrant workers also speak Hindi and Tamil languages.

Administration
This village is part of Manjeswaram assembly constituency which is again part of Kasaragod (Lok Sabha constituency)

References

Manjeshwar area